The D. S. Senanayake cabinet was the central government of Ceylon led by Prime Minister D. S. Senanayake between 1947 and 1952. It was formed in September 1947 after the parliamentary election and it ended in March 1952 with Senanayake's death. The Senanayake cabinet led Ceylon to independence in February 1948.

Cabinet members

Parliamentary secretaries

See also
 Cabinet Office (Sri Lanka)

Notes

References

1947 establishments in Ceylon
1952 disestablishments in Ceylon
Cabinets disestablished in 1952
Cabinets established in 1947
Cabinet of Sri Lanka
Ministries of George VI
Ministries of Elizabeth II